Irvine is an unincorporated community in Marion County, Florida, United States, located along Interstate 75 northwest of Ocala in the vicinity of County Roads 318 and 225.

References

Unincorporated communities in Marion County, Florida
Unincorporated communities in Florida